Touring may refer to:

Travel

Vehicles
 Touring cars, an open car
 "Touring", the estate/wagon version of Ford cars
 Carrozzeria Touring Superleggera, Italian automobile coachbuilder

Tourism
 Bicycle touring, self-contained cycling trips
 Motorcycle touring, tourism that involves a motorcycle
 Ski touring, skiing in the backcountry on unmarked or unpatrolled areas

Performance
 Touring (band), travelling bands
 Touring theatre, travelling theatre

Sports
 Touring car racing, a motorsport road racing competition
 Touring KE, a Spanish football club

Other uses
 "Touring", a song by the Ramones on Mondo Bizarro

 Touring (card game), a specialty card game

See also
 Tour (disambiguation)
 Turing (disambiguation)
 Tourist (disambiguation)
 Tourism (disambiguation)